Vekshin or Vekšin is a Russian masculine surname, its feminine counterpart is Vekshina. It may refer to
Daria Vekshina (born 1985), Russian volleyball player
 Nikolai Vekšin (1887–1951), Estonian Olympic sailor (1928)

Russian-language surnames